Prachatice District is a district in the South Bohemian Region of the Czech Republic. Its capital is the town of Prachatice.

Administrative division
Prachatice District is divided into two administrative districts of municipalities with extended competence: Prachatice and Vimperk.

List of municipalities
Towns are marked in bold and market towns in italics:

Babice -
Bohumilice -
Bohunice -
Borová Lada -
Bošice -
Budkov -
Buk -
Bušanovice -
Chlumany -
Chroboly -
Chvalovice -
Čkyně -
Drslavice -
Dub -
Dvory -
Horní Vltavice -
Hracholusky -
Husinec -
Kratušín -
Křišťanov -
Ktiš -
Kubova Huť -
Kvilda -
Lažiště -
Lčovice -
Lenora -
Lhenice -
Lipovice -
Lužice -
Mahouš -
Malovice -
Mičovice -
Nebahovy -
Němčice -
Netolice -
Nicov -
Nová Pec -
Nové Hutě -
Olšovice -
Pěčnov -
Prachatice -
Radhostice -
Stachy -
Stožec -
Strážný -
Strunkovice nad Blanicí -
Šumavské Hoštice -
Svatá Maří -
Těšovice -
Tvrzice -
Újezdec -
Vacov -
Vimperk -
Vitějovice -
Vlachovo Březí -
Volary -
Vrbice -
Záblatí -
Zábrdí -
Zálezly -
Zbytiny -
Zdíkov -
Žárovná -
Želnava -
Žernovice

Geography

Prachatice District borders Germany in the southwest and briefly Austria in the south. Most of the territory has a foothill character, but along the state border, the landscape is mountainous, and in the east, the terrain is only slightly undulating. The majority of the district is located at an altitude of 600–800 m. The territory extends into three geomorphological mesoregions: Bohemian Forest Foothills (north, centre and southeast), Bohemian Forest (south and west) and České Budějovice Basin (small part in the east).

The most important river is the Vltava, which springs here and flows across the Bohemian Forest mountain range. The Volyňka also springs here and flows to the north. The eastern part of the territory is drained by the Blanice River. This part of the district is rich in ponds, otherwise there are not many bodies of water. A small part of the Lipno Reservoir also extends into the district. Near Plechý is Plešné Lake, one of the few natural lakes in the country.

From west to south, the Šumava National Park stretches across the territory of the district, while the centre of the territory falls under the protection of the Šumava Protected Landscape Area.

Demographics
A German minority used to live in Prachatice, composing 47% of the district's population by 1930. After the World War II, the German population was expelled, and the district experienced a notable demographic change as more ethnic Czechs were settled in the region.

As of 2022, Prachatice District is the third least populated district in the country.

Most populated municipalities

Economy
The largest employers with its headquarters in Prachatice District and at least 500 employers are:

Transport
There are no motorways in the district. The most important road is the I/4, which separates from the D4 motorway and leads through the district to the German border.

Sights

The most important monuments in the district, protected as national cultural monuments, are:
Birthplace of Jan Hus in Husinec
Kratochvíle Castle
Vimperk Castle
Schwarzenberg Canal (partly)

The best-preserved settlements, protected as monument reservations and monument zones, are:

Prachatice (monument reservation)
Dobrá (monument reservation)
Stachy (monument reservation)
Vodice (monument reservation)
Volary (monument reservation)
Husinec
Netolice
Vimperk
Vlachovo Březí
Stachy-Chalupy
Lažiště
Libotyně
Mahouš
Příslop
Třešňový Újezdec
Vitějovice
Zvěřetice

The most visited tourist destination is the Kratochvíle Castle.

References

External links

Prachatice District profile on the Czech Statistical Office's website

 
Districts of the Czech Republic